The 1689 English general election, held in January 1689, elected the Convention Parliament, which was summoned in the aftermath of the Glorious Revolution. 

513 Members of Parliament were returned, across 53 counties and 217 boroughs in England and Wales, most returning two members. Only nine counties and 41 boroughs (a total of 69 seats) had contested elections, with the other candidates being returned unopposed. Six boroughs had double returns, where multiple members were recorded elected, and five of these were subsequently voided by Parliament forcing by-elections.

The majority of seats were not contested on a party basis, but partisan alignment can be identified by historians looking at subsequent voting on key issues. 174 members are identified as Whigs, and 151 as Tories. The remaining members, around 190, are considered uncommitted. An older estimate based on activity throughout the Parliament suggested that the 551 Members (including those returned in by-elections) could be listed as 232 Tories and 319 Whigs or Court Tories, with none classed as uncommitted (but with over 40% recorded as "inactive"). Finally, an estimate at the end of the parliament, when party groups had had time to develop further, estimated the strength of the parties as 254 Whigs, 221 Tories, and 38 uncommitted members.

See also
List of MPs elected to the English Parliament in 1689
Convention Parliament (1689)
List of English Parliaments

Notes

References

17th-century elections in Europe
1689 in politics
1689
General election